In enzymology, a CDP-diacylglycerol diphosphatase is an enzyme that catalyzes the chemical reaction

CDP-diacylglycerol + H2O  CMP + phosphatidate

Thus, the two substrates of this enzyme are CDP-diacylglycerol and H2O, whereas its two products are CMP and phosphatidate.

This enzyme belongs to the family of hydrolases, specifically those acting on acid anhydrides in phosphorus-containing anhydrides.  The systematic name of this enzyme class is CDP-diacylglycerol phosphatidylhydrolase. Other names in common use include cytidine diphosphodiacylglycerol pyrophosphatase, and CDP diacylglycerol hydrolase.  This enzyme participates in glycerophospholipid metabolism.

Structural studies

As of late 2007, only one structure has been solved for this class of enzymes, with the PDB accession code .

References

 

EC 3.6.1
Enzymes of known structure